Hugh Durant (23 February 1877 – 20 January 1916) was a British sport shooter and modern pentathlete who competed in the 1912 Summer Olympics.

In 1912 he won the bronze medal as member of the British team in the team 30 metre military pistol event as well as in the team 50 metre military pistol competition. In the individual 50 metre pistol event he finished 20th. He also participated in the first contested modern pentathlon event and finished 18th.

He was killed in action during World War I.

See also
 List of Olympians killed in World War I

References

1877 births
1916 deaths
British male sport shooters
British male modern pentathletes
ISSF pistol shooters
Olympic shooters of Great Britain
Olympic modern pentathletes of Great Britain
Shooters at the 1912 Summer Olympics
Modern pentathletes at the 1912 Summer Olympics
Olympic bronze medallists for Great Britain
Olympic medalists in shooting
People from Brixton
Sportspeople from London
British military personnel killed in World War I
Medalists at the 1912 Summer Olympics
English Olympic medallists
19th-century British people
20th-century British people